Itobi is a municipality in the state of São Paulo in Brazil. The population is 7,852 (2020 est.) in an area of 139 km². Its elevation is 658m. The name Itobi is derived from the Tupi–Guarani, and means "green river". The town was initially called Vila Nova do Rio Verde but was renamed Itobi in 1898. It became an independent municipality in 1959, when it was separated from Casa Branca.

References

Municipalities in São Paulo (state)